GNOME Software is a utility for installing applications and updates on Linux. It is part of the GNOME Core Applications, and was introduced in GNOME 3.10.

It is the GNOME front-end to the PackageKit, in turn a front-end to several package management systems, which include systems based on both RPM and DEB.

The program is used to add and manage software repositories as well as Ubuntu Personal Package Archives (PPA). Ubuntu replaced its previous Ubuntu Software Center program with GNOME Software starting with Ubuntu 16.04 LTS, and re-branded it as "Ubuntu Software".

It also supports fwupd for servicing of system firmware.

GNOME Software removed Snap support in July 2019, due to code quality issues, lack of integration (specifically, the user can't tell what snap is doing after they click "install" and that it generally ignores GNOME's settings), and the fact that it competes with the GNOME-supported Flatpak standard.

Features
The goals and use cases that GNOME Software targets as of November 2020:

Primary goals
 Allow people to find apps by browsing or search:
 a specific app that they're looking for, or
 apps in a particular category, or with particular functionality that they require
 Allow people to effectively inspect and appraise apps before they install them (screenshots, descriptions, ratings, comments, metadata)
 Allow people to view which apps are installed and remove them
 Present a positive view of the app ecosystem
 Reinforce the sense that there are lots of high quality apps
 Encourage people to engage with that ecosystem, both as users and as contributors
 When browsing, present and promote the best apps that are available
 Facilitate accidental discovery of great apps
 Handle software updates. Make software updates as little work for users as possible. To include: apps,  OS updates (PackageKit, eos, rpm-ostree), firmware
 Support multiple software repositories, defined by both the distributor and users.
 Show which repos are configured. Allow them to be added/removed.
 Handle cases where the same app can be installed from multiple sources.

Secondary goals
 OS upgrades
 Hardware driver installation
 Input method installation
 Respond to application queries for software (apps, codecs, languages)
 Offline and metered connections
 OS updates end of life
 App end of life

Non-goals
 Not a package manager front-end
 Not all repos are equal
 Not all apps are equal

See also
 gnome-packagekit – another GTK-based front-end for PackageKit, which unlike GNOME Software can handle packages, not just applications, and has some advanced features that are missing in GNOME Software
 
 AppStream
 Synaptic (software)

References

External links

Free software programmed in C
GNOME Core Applications
Package management software that uses GTK
Software that uses Meson
Software update managers